Clattenburg is a surname. Notable people with the surname include:

 Mark Clattenburg (born 1975), English football referee
 Mike Clattenburg, Canadian television and film director, producer, and screenwriter